Kamran Ghulam (born 10 October 1995) is a Pakistani cricketer. He was part of Pakistan's squad for the 2014 ICC Under-19 Cricket World Cup. In September 2019, he was named in Khyber Pakhtunkhwa's squad for the 2019–20 Quaid-e-Azam Trophy tournament.

In December 2020, during the 2020–21 Quaid-e-Azam Trophy, he became the first cricketer to score 1,000 runs in a single season of the Quaid-e-Azam Trophy, since the tournament was revamped the previous year. Later the same month, he was shortlisted as one of the Domestic Cricketers of the Year for the 2020 PCB Awards. In January 2021, in the final of the 2020–21 Quaid-e-Azam Trophy, he scored a century in the second innings of the match, and also broke the record for the most runs scored in a single edition of the tournament. Following the final, he was named as the Best Batsman of the tournament.

In January 2021, he was named in Khyber Pakhtunkhwa's squad for the 2020–21 Pakistan Cup. Later the same month, he was named in Pakistan's Test squad for their series against South Africa. In October 2021, he was named in the Pakistan Shaheens squad for their tour of Sri Lanka. On 11 October 2021, in the final group match of the 2021–22 National T20 Cup, he scored his first century in T20 cricket, with an unbeaten 110 runs.

In November 2021, he was named in Pakistan's Test squad for their series against Bangladesh. In February 2022, he was named as a reserve player in Pakistan's Test squad for their series against Australia.

International career
Ghulam made his ODI debut against New Zealand in January 2023.

References

External links
 

1995 births
Living people
Pakistani cricketers
Islamabad cricketers
People from Upper Dir District
Islamabad United cricketers
Gazi Group cricketers
Lahore Qalandars cricketers